Bucze  (formerly German Buchwalde) is a village in the administrative district of Gmina Przewóz, within Żary County, Lubusz Voivodeship, in western Poland, close to the German border. 

The village has a population of 100.

References

Villages in Żary County